Walter Tello (born 13 October 1986) is a Panamanian former professional boxer who competed from 2006 to 2016. He challenged for the WBO interim title in 2009 and the WBA title in 2010, both at mini flyweight.

Professional career
Tello made his professional debut in 2006. After a quick 6-1 start to his career, he fought veteran Edwin Diaz for his WBO Latino mini flyweight title, and won by technical knockout (TKO) on 23 February 2008 for his first belt. After four more wins, he received a shot at the interim WBO mini flyweight title, but lost (in lopsided fashion) to Mexican fighter Manuel Vargas in Hermosillo by unanimous decision (UD) on 14 February 2009. It was his first fight outside Panama.

One year later, he received another world title shot when he fought Giovani Segura, again in Mexico, for his WBA light flyweight title. The bout, held on February 20, 2010, was stopped in Segura's favor in the third round after he landed several punishing uppercuts and hooks on the young Panamanian.

Tello lost consecutive bouts to world title contender Carlos Melo in November 2010 and March 2011, both by decision. However, Tello followed this up by defeating fellow countrymen Carlos Ortega twice within a span of a 17 months. This earned him a third world title shot. He fought Alberto Rossel for the interim WBA light flyweight belt in Callao, Peru on March 16, 2013. During the later rounds of the fight, Tello came close to getting knocked down various times, but survived all 12 rounds. However, the judges scored the bout 118-115, 118-114 and 117-111, all in favor of the hometown favorite, Rossel.

Tello won his second championship belt when he defeated Erick Flores (for the third time in his career) in Panama City on 4 June 2014 by fifth-round TKO to win the vacant WBC Latino light flyweight title. Flores abandoned the fight after an injury to his right shoulder.

Tello traveled to Shanghai to fight Randy Petalcorin for the WBA interim light flyweight title. Tello was knocked down in the seventh round with a right hook. Tello rose up, but was knocked down again shortly thereafter by a left cross. After the second knockdown, referee Raul Caiz, Sr. stopped the fight and awarded Petalcorin with the belt.

Professional boxing record

| style="text-align:center;" colspan="8"|21 Wins (8 knockouts, 13 decisions), 10 Losses (4 knockouts, 6 decisions), 0 Draws
|-  style="text-align:center; background:#e3e3e3;"
|  style="border-style:none none solid solid; "|Res.
|  style="border-style:none none solid solid; "|Record
|  style="border-style:none none solid solid; "|Opponent
|  style="border-style:none none solid solid; "|Type
|  style="border-style:none none solid solid; "|Rd., Time
|  style="border-style:none none solid solid; "|Date
|  style="border-style:none none solid solid; "|Location
|  style="border-style:none none solid solid; "|Notes
|- align=center
|Loss
|align=center|21–10||align=left| Azael Villar
|
|
|
|align=left|
|align=left|
|- align=center
|Loss
|align=center|21–9||align=left| Juan Jose Landaeta
|
|
|
|align=left|
|align=left|
|- align=center
|Win
|align=center|21–8||align=left| Edwin Diaz
|
|
|
|align=left|
|align=left|
|- align=center
|Loss
|align=center|20–8||align=left| Randy Petalcorin
|
|
|
|align=left|
|align=left|
|- align=center
|Win
|align=center|20–7||align=left| Erick Flores
|
|
|
|align=left|
|align=left|
|- align=center
|Win
|align=center|19–7||align=left| Dennis Espinoza
|
|
|
|align=left|
|align=left|
|- align=center
|Loss
|align=center|18–7||align=left| Alberto Rossel
|
|
|
|align=left|
|align=left|
|- align=center
|Win
|align=center|18–6||align=left| Carlos Ortega
|
|
|
|align=left|
|align=left|
|- align=center
|Win
|align=center|17–6||align=left| Reynaldo Mendoza
|
|
|
|align=left|
|align=left|
|- align=center
|Win
|align=center|16–6||align=left| Carlos Ortega
|
|
|
|align=left|
|align=left|
|- align=center
|Loss
|align=center|15–6||align=left| Carlos Melo
|
|
|
|align=left|
|align=left|
|- align=center
|Loss
|align=center|15–5||align=left| Carlos Melo
|
|
|
|align=left|
|align=left|
|- align=center
|Win
|align=center|15–4||align=left| Jorle Estrada
|
|
|
|align=left|
|align=left|
|- align=center
|Loss
|align=center|14–4||align=left| Giovani Segura
|
|
|
|align=left|
|align=left|
|- align=center
|Win
|align=center|14–3||align=left| Erick Flores
|
|
|
|align=left|
|align=left|
|- align=center
|Loss
|align=center|13–3||align=left| Luis Alberto Rios
|
|
|
|align=left|
|align=left|
|- align=center
|Win
|align=center|13–2||align=left| Marlon Chavarria
|
|
|
|align=left|
|align=left|
|- align=center
|Win
|align=center|12–2||align=left| Reynaldo Frutos
|
|
|
|align=left|
|align=left|
|- align=center
|Loss
|align=center|11–2||align=left| Manuel Vargas
|
|
|
|align=left|
|align=left|
|- align=center
|Win
|align=center|11–1||align=left| Carlos Luis Campos
|
|
|
|align=left|
|align=left|
|- align=center
|Win
|align=center|10–1||align=left| Elvis Villagra
|
|
|
|align=left|
|align=left|
|- align=center
|Win
|align=center|9–1||align=left| Jose Humberto Caraballo
|
|
|
|align=left|
|align=left|
|- align=center
|Win
|align=center|8–1||align=left| Humberto Obando
|
|
|
|align=left|
|align=left|
|- align=center
|Win
|align=center|7–1||align=left| Edwin Díaz
|
|
|
|align=left|
|align=left|
|- align=center
|Win
|align=center|6–1||align=left| Erick Flores
|
|
|
|align=left|
|align=left|
|- align=center
|Win
|align=center|5–1||align=left| Javier Carpintero
|
|
|
|align=left|
|align=left|
|- align=center
|Win
|align=center|4–1||align=left| Jesus Santos
|
|
|
|align=left|
|align=left|
|- align=center
|Win
|align=center|3–1||align=left| Ivan Gallardo
|
|
|
|align=left|
|align=left|
|- align=center
|Win
|align=center|2–1||align=left| Humberto Obando
|
|
|
|align=left|
|align=left|
|- align=center
|Win
|align=center|1–1||align=left| Jesus Santos
|
|
|
|align=left|
|align=left|
|- align=center
|Loss
|align=center|0–1|| align=left| Ivan Gallardo
|
|||
|align=left|
|align=left|

Personal life
Tello is a part-time police officer in his native Panama.

References

External links
 

1986 births
Living people
Panamanian male boxers
Mini-flyweight boxers
Light-flyweight boxers
People from Barú District, Chiriquí
21st-century Panamanian people